The Citroën Lacoste is a concept mini SUV designed by Citroën and Lacoste for the 2010 Paris Motor Show. It is an economical, no-door mini SUV, featuring a 1.2-litre petrol engine emitting fewer than 100g/km of CO2. It was expected to enter production by 2013, but for undisclosed reasons this did not happen.

It has special features, including an inflatable roof that emerges from the centre roof rail. It also has a movable steering wheel to improve access. The vehicle has no doors. This concept was inspired by the Citroën Méhari of the 1970s, and the 2007 Citroën C-Cactus concept car.

Gallery

References

External links
 Autocar

Lacoste
Crossover sport utility vehicles
Mini sport utility vehicles